The 3rd African Youth Games took place in Algiers, Algeria from 18 to 28 July 2018. The Games featured approximately 3,300 athletes from 55 African countries who competed in 30 sports. Algiers was awarded the games by Association of National Olympic Committees of Africa in 2014.

Participating nations 

 (host) (432)

 Sahrawi Republic
 

 (206)

Sports
Thirty sports were contested in this edition of African Youth Games. Archery, athletics, beach volleyball, field hockey, rowing, and rugby sevens competition also served as qualification for the 2018 Youth Olympic Games.

 
 
 
 
 
 
 
 
 
 
 
 
 
 
 
 
 
 
 
 
 
 
 
 
 
 
 
 
 
 
 

Exhibition sports

Medal table

References

External links
 Official site
 Results

 
African Youth Games
Multi-sport events in Algeria
African Youth Games
African Youth Games
Youth Games
International sports competitions hosted by Algeria
African Youth Games